Lotupue David Aupiu (born February 10, 1961 in Honolulu, Hawaii) is a former professional American football Linebacker in the National Football League. He played for the Los Angeles Rams in 1987.

Prior to his NFL career, Aupiu participated in preseason for the Jacksonville Bulls of the United States Football League, but was released prior to the 1984 season.

External links
Pro-Football reference

References

1961 births
Living people
Players of American football from Honolulu
Los Angeles Rams players
BYU Cougars football players